Furnace is a hamlet in Ceredigion, Wales on the A487 trunk road from Machynlleth to Aberystwyth, near Eglwysfach.

It is the location of the Dyfi Furnace, used from the 1750s to the 19th century to make pig iron with charcoal as fuel. The site had been used by the Silver Mills of the Society of Mines Royal.

External links 
www.geograph.co.uk : photos of Furnace and surrounding area

Villages in Ceredigion
Water wheels in Wales